National School of Arts may refer to:

 Conservatoire national des arts et métiers, Paris
 Danish National School of Performing Arts, Copenhagen
 Escuela Nacional de Artes Plásticas "Rafael Rodríguez Padilla", Guatemala City
 Escuela Nacional de Bellas Artes, several schools in Spanish-speaking countries
 Korea National University of Arts, Seoul
 National Art Schools (Cuba)
 National College of Arts, Lahore, Pakistan
 National Taiwan University of Arts in Taiwan
 National School of Arts (UNAM), in Mexico